Felipinho is a nick name, a diminutive for Felipe. It may refer to:

 Felipinho (footballer, born 1992), Felipe Barreto da Silva, Brazilian football forward
 Felipinho (footballer, born 1997), Luis Felipe Machado de Oliveira, Brazilian football forward
 Felipinho (footballer, born 2002), Felipe José Almeida da Rocha, Brazilian football forward